Shestykovo is a rural locality (a selo) in Suslovsky Selsoviet, Birsky District, Bashkortostan, Russia. The population was 217 as of 2010. There are 8 streets.

Geography 
Shestykovo is located 17 km northeast of Birsk (the district's administrative centre) by road. Demidovsky is the nearest rural locality.

References 

Rural localities in Birsky District